When the Grapevines Bloom on the Danube is a 1965 German-Austrian comedy film directed by Géza von Cziffra and starring Hansjörg Felmy, Ingeborg Schöner and Gaston Brocksieper. The cinematographer was Heinz Pehlke. Its German title is An der Donau, wenn der Wein blüht.

Cast
 Hansjörg Felmy ...  Frank Richter
 Ingeborg Schöner ...  Gabriele Welser
 Gaston Brocksieper ...  Florian Richter
 Peter Weck ...  Dr. Walter Kuntz
 Letícia Román ...  Susi Müller
 Elisabeth Markus ...  Hofrätin Welser
 Richard Eybner ...  Diener Ferdinand
 Ottilie Iwald ...  Frau Beck
 Edd Stavjanik ...  Chauffeur Martin
 Hans Habietinek ...  Tagportier
 Fritz Puchstein ...  Nachtportier

References

External links

1965 films
1965 romantic comedy films
German romantic comedy films
Austrian romantic comedy films
West German films
1960s German-language films
Films directed by Géza von Cziffra
Films about vacationing
1960s German films